Jaame Masjid, also known as the Jaame Masjid Islamic Cultural Centre is a mosque in Blackburn, Lancashire, England. It was established from a house in 1962, incorporating two terrace houses, and has since been expanded on several occasions. It became the first Masjid in Lancashire, recognised as the official central mosque of Blackburn.

See also
 List of mosques
 List of mosques in Europe
 List of mosques in Great Britain

External links
 Official website

References

Buildings and structures in Blackburn
Mosques in England
Religion in Lancashire
Mosques completed in 1962
Mosque buildings with domes
Blackburn